Jeremy Chabriel (born 2 December 2001) is a French–Australian actor. He is best known for his role as Alexander in Ariel Kleiman's film Partisan, candidate at the 2015 Sundance Film Festival.

Biography
Chabriel was born in Toulouse, France.  He now he lives in Kuala Lumpur, Malaysia.

Chabriel travelled the world with his parents and his brother from the age of 2. This globetrotting life brought him wonderful experiences in addition to making him discover a multitude of cultures.

He planned to take acting lessons when his family heard about the casting for Partisan, and was offered the chance to audition and play this role.

Filmography

Film

References

External links
 

2001 births
French male child actors
French male film actors
Australian male child actors
Australian male film actors
Living people